The Highgate Road railway stations were two adjacent but separate stations of the Tottenham & Hampstead Junction Railway in the north of Kentish Town, in St Pancras, London, now the London Borough of Camden. They were located on separate and parallel lines that joined east of the stations. The lines through both stations remain open.

High level station 
The High Level station was on a viaduct over Highgate Road on what is now the Gospel Oak to Barking Line. It opened in 1868 and closed in 1915. At one time a link led to Kentish Town station on the up Midland Main Line (MML).

Low level station
The Low Level station opened in 1900 and closed in 1918. It was located on the west side of Highgate Road in a cutting which passed under the Road and connected to the up MML and to the North London Line heading east.

References 

Disused railway stations in the London Borough of Camden
Former Tottenham and Hampstead Junction Railway stations
Railway stations in Great Britain opened in 1868
Railway stations in Great Britain closed in 1915
Former Midland Railway stations
Railway stations in Great Britain opened in 1900
Railway stations in Great Britain closed in 1918